Jon Olav Hjelde (born 30 July 1972) is a Norwegian former professional footballer who played as a central defender.

Career
Born in Levanger, Hjelde began his career at his local team Vuku, which competed in the Norwegian Third Division.

He joined Rosenborg in 1994, where he became backup to the team's regular central defenders Erik Hoftun and Bjørn Otto Bragstad. Despite not being a regular in the Rosenborg side, he played in the club's historic 1996–97 UEFA Champions League group-stage win over A.C. Milan at the San Siro that eliminated the Italians, and featured in the quarter-final first-leg draw against previous-season Champions League winners Juventus. The two performances caused the squad to be nicknamed the "Heroes of Milan", and scouts from across Europe became interested in Rosenborg players, including Hjelde. Although Italian club Bari attempted to sign Hjelde in 1997, he instead accepted a late offer from Nottingham Forest and soon became a regular in Forest's first-team, where he played for six seasons.

Hjelde moved to South Korea in 2003 to join former Asian Club Championship and Afro-Asian Club Championship winners Busan I'cons, despite interest from Stoke City manager Tony Pulis. Busan had once been a dominant K League side, but due to a change in ownership ahead of the 2000 season, triggered by the 1997 Asian financial crisis, the club suffered from a reduced budget. Busan manager Ian Porterfield, famous during his earlier playing career for scoring the winning goal of the 1973 FA Cup Final, signed three out-of-contract players from English football in mid-2003, including Hjelde. Hjelde played the latter-half of the 2003 K League season for Busan, but didn't feature in the 2004 season due to a knee injury, and was released by Busan in mid-2004. Hjelde's time playing in South Korea is documented in the book, Who Ate All the Squid?: Football Adventures in South Korea.

He rejoined Forest after one year in Korea, but played only sporadically and was released at the end of the 2004–05 season.

At this point, Hjelde considered moving back to Norway, but instead signed a one-year deal with Forest's lower-league neighbours Mansfield Town in the summer of 2005. He played regularly for the Stags, forming a defensive team alongside Alex Baptiste. Hjelde indicated that he would move back to Norway at the end of the 2005-06 season, but later changed his mind, and signed a new one-year contract with the Stags. In May 2007, he retired from football.

Personal life
Hjelde's son, Leo Hjelde, is also a footballer, playing for Premier League club Leeds United and the Norway U19 national team.

References

External links
 

1972 births
Living people
People from Levanger
Norwegian footballers
Association football defenders
Eliteserien players
Premier League players
English Football League players
K League 1 players
Rosenborg BK players
Nottingham Forest F.C. players
Busan IPark players
Mansfield Town F.C. players
Norwegian expatriate footballers
Norwegian expatriate sportspeople in England
Expatriate footballers in England
Norwegian expatriate sportspeople in South Korea
Expatriate footballers in South Korea
Sportspeople from Trøndelag